Alfred Allen may refer to:

Alfred Allen (actor) (1886–1947), American silent film actor
Alfred Allen (Australian politician) (1839–1917), New South Wales colonial politician
Alfred Allen (executioner) (c. 1888–1938), English executioner
Alfred Allen, Baron Allen of Fallowfield (1914–1985), British life peer and trade unionist
Alfred G. Allen (1867–1932), U.S. Representative from Ohio
Alfred E. Allen (1912–1987), New Zealand politician
Alfie Owen-Allen (born 1986), English actor

See also
Allen (surname)